Alin Mile Berescu (born April 14, 1980, Timișoara, Romania) chess grandmaster and FIDE trainer from Romania. He was the Vice-President of the Romanian Chess Federation. Berescu won the International Master title in 2001 and grandmaster title in 2007. He was the winner of the Romanian Chess Championship in 2004 and 2005.

Notable Tournaments

References 

1980 births
Living people
Chess grandmasters
Romanian chess players
Sportspeople from Timișoara